Rushford may refer to:

Places

United Kingdom
 Rushford, Devon, a United Kingdom location
 Rushford, Norfolk
 Rushford, Warwickshire

United States
 Rushford, Minnesota
 Rushford, New York, a town
 Rushford (CDP), New York, the central settlement in the town
 Rushford, Wisconsin